Donald Barry de Acosta (January 11, 1912 – July 17, 1980), also known as Red Barry and Milton Poimboeuf, was an American film and television actor. He was nicknamed "Red" after appearing as the first Red Ryder in the highly successful 1940 film Adventures of Red Ryder with Noah Beery Sr.; the character was played in later films by "Wild Bill" Elliott and Allan Lane. Barry went on to bigger budget films following Red Ryder, but none reached his previous level of success.  He played Red Doyle in the 1964 Perry Mason episode 'The Case of the Simple Simon'.

Early years 
Barry was born in Houston, Texas, to parents Louis Leonce Poimboeuf and Emma Murray Poimboeuf. He attended Allen Academy and the Texas School of Mines. Prior to acting, Barry had been a high school and college football player. He went to Los Angeles, California, to work in advertising.

Career

Stage 
Barry's initial venture into acting was in a production of Tobacco Road on stage in New York in the late 1930s.

Acting 
Barry first entered films as an extra and in small roles.  He was discovered by John Wayne during a football game with Wayne providing Barry introductions to producers.   He appeared in a variety of roles before he found his forte and nickname "Red" in the Republic Pictures serial The Adventures of Red Ryder (1940). Though Barry was short and stocky rather than the lean and lanky hero of the Red Ryder comic strip, studio head Herbert J. Yates demanded Barry play the role.  Yates thought Barry's appearance similar to James Cagney with Barry unsuccessfully asking Yates to cast him in gangster films.  Barry continued in Western roles and made two war films Remember Pearl Harbor (1942) for Republic as well as being loaned out to 20th Century Fox for The Purple Heart (1944). He continued making Westerns for Republic and other studios.

By the 1950s, Barry was a supporting actor instead of playing leads in westerns. Early in 1955, he appeared as the bandit Milt Sharp in an episode of the syndicated series, Stories of the Century, starring and narrated by Jim Davis. 

Barry played "Clete" in the 1956 western film Seven Men from Now, starring Randolph Scott. In 1958 he appeared (credited as Donald Barry) on the TV western Cheyenne in the episode "Dead to Rights." He guest starred as Tanner in the 1958 episode "Bullet Proof" of the ABC/Warner Brothers series Sugarfoot, starring Will Hutchins; he was cast as Arkansas in the 1959 Sugarfoot episode "The Return of the Canary Kid". Barry appeared four times in the ABC/WB western Colt .45. Barry was cast as black-clad gunfighter in a 1961 episode, "Last Stop: Oblivion", of the ABC/WB western series, Maverick with Jack Kelly and fellow guest star Buddy Ebsen, as well as an even larger titular role in a James Garner episode set in New Orleans titled "The Resurrection of Joe November."  In 1961 Barry appeared as Dusty McCade in the TV western Lawman in the episode titled "Hassayampa."

Barry's voice in the television Westerns sounded much like that of the character actor Dub Taylor. About this time, he also guest starred on two other ABC/WB dramas, Bourbon Street Beat and The Roaring 20s. He appeared as well in the syndicated crime drama, U.S. Marshal, starring John Bromfield, and the NBC education drama series, Mr. Novak, starring James Franciscus.

Barry continued making Westerns as part of the ensemble casts of A.C. Lyles Paramount second feature Westerns in the mid 1960s.

In 1966, Barry played Confederate soldier "Lt. Farrow" in the Western film Alvarez Kelly with William Holden and a one-eyed Richard Widmark. Barry played a supporting role in the 1968 film, Shalako with Sean Connery, as well as in the television series Dragnet.
(1972)Adam 12: portrayed a Con-Man Hobbs}

Barry played supporting roles in dozens of television series, particularly Westerns. He appeared eight times on the long-running NBC series, The Virginian, in the 1960s. He appeared in six episodes of Michael Landon's Little House on the Prairie as racist farmer Judd Larrabee, and appeared in all-star TV miniseries, such as Rich Man, Poor Man Book II and The Dream Merchants.

Writing 

In addition to acting, Barry was also a writer, writing the stories upon which the films Red Light (1949) starring George Raft and Virginia Mayo, Train to Tombstone (1950), and Convict Stage (1965) were based, and co-writing the screenplay as well as directing and playing the leading role of Jesse James in Jesse James' Women (1954).

Personal life 
During the height of his Red Ryder fame, he married B-movie actress Peggy Stewart, they divorced on April 12, 1944. He married Ona-Dell Ward on October 6, 1947. They divorced sometime before 1952.

In early November 1955 Susan Hayward got into a fight with another actress who caught her visiting Barry's apartment for an early morning coffee, which made the tabloids and became the source of insider jokes.

Death 
On July 17, 1980, Barry shot himself in the head at his home, shortly after police had left the residence after investigating a domestic dispute. He was estranged at the time from his third wife, Barbara, with whom he had two daughters. He is interred at Forest Lawn Memorial Park in the Hollywood Hills of Los Angeles.

Selected filmography

This Day and Age (1933) .... Student (uncredited)
Flying Down to Rio (1933) .... Dancer (uncredited)
The Hoosier Schoolmaster (1935) .... Rebel Soldier (uncredited)
Night Waitress (1936) .... Mario Rigo
Beloved Enemy (1936) .... Mike - IRA Patriot (uncredited)
When's Your Birthday? (1937) .... Marty - Gunman (uncredited)
The Woman I Love (1937) .... Michel
Dead End (1937) .... Dr. Flynn - Intern (uncredited)
The Last Gangster (1937) .... Billy Ernst (uncredited)
Navy Blue and Gold (1937) .... Mason - Southern Institute Football Player
All American Sweetheart (1937) .... Bob - Crew Leader (uncredited)
 Saleslady (1938) .... Babcock
Sinners in Paradise (1938) .... Jessup
Letter of Introduction (1938) .... Disbelieving Man at Barry's Party (uncredited)
The Crowd Roars (1938) .... Pete Mariola
Young Dr. Kildare (1938) .... Dr. Collins (uncredited)
The Duke of West Point (1938) .... Cadet Grady
There's That Woman Again (1938) .... Bellboy (uncredited)
Panama Patrol (1939) .... Lieutenant Loring
First Offenders (1939) .... Art
Calling Dr. Kildare (1939) .... Dr. Collins
Only Angels Have Wings (1939) .... 'Tex'
S.O.S. Tidal Wave (1939) .... 'Curley' Parsons
Wyoming Outlaw (1939) .... Will Parker
Calling All Marines (1939) .... 'Blackie' Cross
Saga of Death Valley (1939) .... Jerry
The Secret of Dr. Kildare (1939) .... Dr. Collins - Intern (uncredited)
Days of Jesse James (1939) .... Jesse James
Ghost Valley Raiders (1940) .... Tim 'The Tolusa Kid' Brandon
Adventures of Red Ryder (1940, Serial) .... 'Red' Ryder
One Man's Law (1940) .... Jack Summers
Sailor's Lady (1940) .... Second Paymaster (uncredited)
The Tulsa Kid (1940) .... Tom 'The Tulsa Kid' Benton
Frontier Vengeance (1940) .... Jim Sanders
Texas Terrors (1940) .... Bob Millbourne / Robert Mills
Wyoming Wildcat (1941) .... Bill Gannon
The Phantom Cowboy (1941) .... Jim Lawrence
Two Gun Sheriff (1941) .... Jim 'The Sundown Kid' McKinnon / Bruce McKinnon
Desert Bandit (1941) .... Texas Ranger Bob Crandall
Kansas Cyclone (1941) .... Jim Randall
The Apache Kid (1941) .... Pete 'The Apache Kid' Dawson
Death Valley Outlaws (1941) .... Johnny Edwards
A Missouri Outlaw (1941) .... Cliff Dixon
Arizona Terrors (1942) .... Jim Bradley
Stagecoach Express (1942) .... Dave Gregory
Jesse James, Jr. (1942) .... Johnny Barrett
Remember Pearl Harbor (1942) .... Private Steve 'Lucky' Smith
The Cyclone Kid (1942) .... Johnny 'The Cyclone Kid' Dawson
The Sombrero Kid (1942) .... Jerry Holden / Jerry Clancy
Outlaws of Pine Ridge (1942) .... 'Chips' Barrett
The Traitor Within (1942) .... Sam Starr
The Sundown Kid (1942) .... 'Red' Tracy / Wade Crandall
Dead Man's Gulch (1943) .... 'Tennessee' Colby
Carson City Cyclone (1943) .... Gilbert Phalen
Days of Old Cheyenne (1943) .... Clint Ross
Fugitive from Sonora (1943) .... Parson Dave Winters / Ted Winters / Keeno Phillips
Black Hills Express (1943) .... Lon Walker
The West Side Kid (1943) .... Johnny April
The Man from the Rio Grande (1943) .... Lee Grant
Canyon City (1943) .... Terry Reynolds - Posing As The Nevada Kid
California Joe (1943) .... Lieutenant Joe Weldon
The Purple Heart (1944) .... Lieutenant Peter Vincent
Outlaws of Santa Fe (1944) .... Bob Conroy
My Buddy (1944) .... Eddie Ballinger
Bells of Rosarita (1945) .... Don Barry
The Chicago Kid (1945) .... Joe Ferrill
The Last Crooked Mile (1946) .... Tom Dwyer
Plainsman and the Lady (1946) .... 'Feisty'
Out California Way (1946) .... Don Barry
That's My Gal (1947) .... Benny Novak
Slippy McGee (1948) .... 'Slippy' McGee
Madonna of the Desert (1948) .... Tony French
Lightnin' in the Forest (1948) .... Stan Martin
Train to Alcatraz (1948) .... Doug Forbes
Ringside (1949) .... Mike O'Hara / 'King Cobra'
The Dalton Gang (1949) .... Marshal Larry West - Posing As 'Rusty' Stevens
Square Dance Jubilee (1949) .... Don Blake
Tough Assignment (1949) .... Dan Reilly
Red Desert (1949) .... Pecos Jones
I Shot Billy the Kid (1950) .... William H. 'Billy The Kid' Bonney
Gunfire (1950) .... Frank James / 'Bat' Fenton
Train to Tombstone (1950) .... Len Howard
Border Rangers (1950) .... Bob Standish - Posing As 'The Rio Kid'
My Outlaw Brother (1951) .... Texas Ranger Hank (uncredited)
Untamed Heiress (1954) .... Mike 'Spider Mike' Lawrence
Jesse James' Women (1954) .... Jesse James / J. Woodsen
The Twinkle in God's Eye (1955) .... Dawson
I'll Cry Tomorrow (1955) .... Jerry
Seven Men from Now (1956) .... Clete
Gun Duel in Durango (1957) .... Larry
China Doll (1958) .... Master Sergeant Hal Foster
Frankenstein 1970 (1958) .... Douglas Row
Born Reckless (1958) .... 'Okie'
Andy Hardy Comes Home (1958) .... Councilman Fitzgerald (uncredited)
The Last Mile (1959) .... Drake
Bat Masterson (1959) .... Luke Short
Warlock (1959) .... Edward Calhoun (uncredited)
The Big Operator (1959) .... Sergeant
Walk Like a Dragon (1960) .... Cabot
Ocean's 11 (1960) .... McCoy (uncredited)
Buffalo Gun (1961) .... Murdock
Walk on the Wild Side (1962) .... Dockery
Twilight of Honor (1963) .... Judson Elliot
Law of the Lawless (1964) .... 'Red'
Iron Angel (1964) .... 'Reb'
The Carpetbaggers (1964) .... Soundman (uncredited)
War Party (1965) .... Sergeant Chaney
Fort Courageous (1965) .... Captain Howard
Convict Stage (1965) .... Marshal Jethro Karnin
Town Tamer (1965) .... 'Tex'
Apache Uprising (1965) .... Henry Belden
Alvarez Kelly (1966) .... Lieutenant Farrow
Red Tomahawk (1966) .... Bly - Deserter
Hostile Guns (1967) .... Ed Johnson
Fort Utah (1967) .... Harris
Bandolero! (1968) .... Jack Hawkins
The Shakiest Gun in the West (1968) .... Reverend Zachary Gant 
Shalako (1968) .... 'Buffalo'
The Cockeyed Cowboys of Calico County (1970) .... 'Rusty'
Dirty Dingus Magee (1970) .... 'Shotgun'
Rio Lobo (1970) .... Feeny - The Bartender (uncredited)
One More Train to Rob (1971) .... Charlie
Johnny Got His Gun (1971) .... Jody Simmons
Junior Bonner (1972) .... Homer Rutledge
 Adam-12, as Charlie Bishop, ex-con not adjusting to life outside of prison, 10/29/74
Blazing Stewardesses (1975) .... Mike Trask
Whiffs (1975) .... Sergeant Post
Hustle (1975) .... Airport Bartender
From Noon till Three (1976) .... 'Red Roxy'
Orca (1977) .... Dock Worker
Doctor Dracula (1978) .... Elliot
Hot Lead and Cold Feet (1978) .... Bartender
The Swarm (1978) .... Pete Harris
Hooper (1978) .... Sheriff
Buckstone County Prison (1978) .... Warden Coley
The One Man Jury (1978) .... Sergeant Murphy
Shame, Shame on the Bixby Boys (1978)
Back Roads (1981) .... Pete (Final Film Role)

References

External links

 
 

1912 births
1980 deaths
Male actors from Houston
American male film actors
American male television actors
Suicides by firearm in California
Burials at Forest Lawn Memorial Park (Hollywood Hills)
20th-century American male actors
Male actors from Los Angeles
Western (genre) television actors
1980 suicides